Eccles may refer to:

Places

England
 Eccles, Greater Manchester, a town in North West England
 Eccles (UK Parliament constituency), an electoral division represented in the House of Commons of the United Kingdom
 Eccles (ward), an electoral ward
 Eccles, Kent, England
 Eccles on Sea, Norfolk, England

Scotland
 Eccles, Scottish Borders

France
 Eccles, Nord, a commune in Nord department, France

United States
 Eccles, West Virginia, an unincorporated community in West Virginia
 Eccles Avenue Historic District, Ogden, Utah
 Eccles Broadcast Center, Salt Lake City, Utah
 Eccles Building, Washington, D.C.
 Eccles Coliseum, in Cedar City, Utah, home of the Southern Utah University football team
 Rice-Eccles Stadium, in Salt Lake City, Utah, home of the University of Utah football team

Transport
 Eccles railway station in Eccles Greater Manchester.
 Eccles Interchange tram/bus interchange in Eccles Greater Manchester.
 Eccles Line a tram line in Greater Manchester.
 Eccles Road railway station in Norfolk, England

Other uses
 Eccles. or Eccl. stands for Ecclesiastes, one of 24 books of the Hebrew Bible. Distinct from Ecclus., which stands for the Jewish work of ethical teachings, Ecclesiasticus
 Eccles (character), a character in The Goon Show
 Eccles (surname)
 Eccles College
 Eccles cake, a currant-filled cake
 Eccles Mine Disaster where an estimated 180 men died
 Eccles, abbreviation for Ecclesiastes, an Old Testament (Hebrew Bible) book

See also
 Ackles
 Ekels
 Eckels